The Under Secretary for Arms Control and International Security Affairs (T) is a position within the U.S. Department of State that serves as Senior Adviser to the President and the Secretary of State for Arms Control, Nonproliferation, and Disarmament.

In this capacity, the Under Secretary (U/S) attends and participates, at the direction of the President, in National Security Council (NSC) and subordinate meetings pertaining to arms control, nonproliferation, and disarmament and has the right to communicate, through the Secretary of State, with the President and members of the NSC on arms control, nonproliferation, and disarmament concerns.

The U/S also leads the interagency policy process on nonproliferation and manages global U.S. security policy, principally in the areas of nonproliferation, arms control, regional security and defense relations, and arms transfers and security assistance. The U/S provides policy direction in the following areas: nonproliferation, including the missile and nuclear areas, as well as chemical, biological, and conventional weapons proliferation; arms control, including negotiation, ratification, verification and compliance, and implementation of agreements on strategic, non-conventional, and conventional forces; regional security and defense relations, involving policy regarding U.S. security commitments worldwide as well as on the use of U.S. military forces in unilateral or international peacekeeping roles; and arms transfers and security assistance programs and arms transfer policies.

By delegation from the Secretary, the U/S performs a range of functions under the Foreign Assistance Act, Arms Export Control Act, and related legislation. The bureaus of International Security and Nonproliferation, Political-Military Affairs, and Arms Control, Verification, and Compliance are under the policy oversight of the Under Secretary for Arms Control and International Security. By statute, the Assistant Secretary for Arms Control, Verification, and Compliance reports to the Under Secretary for Arms Control and International Security.

According to the Office of the Historian of the U.S. Department of State, the Under Secretary first received the permanent title "Senior Adviser to the President and the Secretary of State for Arms Control, Nonproliferation and Disarmament" when the Clinton administration decided to merge the Arms Control and Disarmament Agency and the United States Information Agency into the State Department, as well as realigning the United States Agency for International Development with it.

List of Under Secretaries of State for International Security Affairs, 1972–1993

List of Under Secretaries of State for Arms Control and International Security, 1993–present

References

External links
 The website of the Under Secretary for Arms Control and International Security
 The Office of the Historian's page on Department of State organizational changes during the Clinton administration

 
1972 introductions
Arms control people
United States national security policy